Berta Miquel (born 26 March 2006) is an Andorran rhythmic gymnast. She represents her country in international competitions.

Personal life 
Miquel took up the sport at age six, having seen the World Gymnaestrada.

Career 
Miquel's first major competition was the 2020 European Championships in Kyiv. She came 38th with rope, 38th with ball, 36th with clubs and 33rd with ribbon.

She debuted as senior gymnast at the 2022 World Cup in Pamplona. She was 26th in the All-Around, 27th with hoop, 26th with ball, 26th with clubs and 27th with ribbon.

A month later she took part in the European Championships in Tel Aviv with teammate Maria Gonzalez, ending in 57th place in the All-Around, 61st with hoop, 56th with ball, 59th with clubs, 44th with ribbon.

In August 2022 she competed at the Gymnastics World Cup in Cluj-Napoca ending 40th in the All-Around, 41st with hoop, 39th with ball, 38th with clubs, 36th with ribbon.

In September 2022 Miquel competed in the World Gymnastics Championships in Sofia, taking 70th place in the All-Around, 75th with hoop, 64th with ball, 68th with clubs, 68th with ribbon.

References 

2006 births
Living people
Andorran rhythmic gymnasts
People from Andorra la Vella